The 2019 Tour of Bihor was the 4th edition of the Tour of Bihor, between 6 and 9 June 2019. The tour was rated as a 2.1 event, as part of the 2019 UCI Europe Tour.

Route

Teams
Twenty teams were invited to start the race. These included one UCI Professional Continental, sixteen UCI Continental teams and three national teams.

Stages

Stage 1
7 June 2019 — Oradea to Oradea (via Salonta),

Stage 2a
8 June 2019 — Oradea,

Stage 2b
8 June 2019 — Oradea to Padiș,

Stage 3
9 June 2019 — Oradea to Oradea (via Marghita),

Classification leadership table

Standings

General classification

Points classification

Mountains classification

Young rider classification

Team classification

See also

 2019 in men's road cycling
 2019 in sports

References

External links

2019 UCI Europe Tour
2019 in Romanian sport
Sport in Bihor County
2019
Tour of Bihor